The Delmont Public School is a historic former school building at 205 West Third Street in Delmont, South Dakota.  It is a three-story brick building, designed by the Nebraska firm of Grabe and Hellberg and built in 1923.  Its styling is a vernacular rendition of Collegiate Gothic, with a central entrance framed by buttresses rising to an arch at the second level. The auditorium, added in 1938, extends from the rear of the main block.

The building was listed on the National Register of Historic Places in 1994.  The school has since been closed and sold into private hands.

See also
National Register of Historic Places listings in Douglas County, South Dakota

References

School buildings on the National Register of Historic Places in South Dakota
Gothic Revival architecture in South Dakota
School buildings completed in 1938
Buildings and structures in Douglas County, South Dakota
National Register of Historic Places in Douglas County, South Dakota